The 2023 Nigerian Senate elections in Delta State will be held on 25 February 2023, to elect the 3 federal Senators from Delta State, one from each of the state's three senatorial districts. The elections will coincide with the 2023 presidential election, as well as other elections to the Senate and elections to the House of Representatives; with state elections being held two weeks later. Primaries were held between 4 April and 9 June 2022.

Background
In terms of the previous Senate elections, all three incumbent senators were re-elected: in the Central district, Ovie Omo-Agege (LP-turned-APC) held his seat for the APC with 51% of the vote; on the other hand, the PDP's Peter Nwaoboshi and James Manager won with 82% in the North district and 66% in the South district, respectively. These results were a part of a continuation of the PDP's control of the state as Governor Ifeanyi Okowa was re-elected with over 80% of the vote in the gubernatorial election and the party held its sizeable majority in the House of Assembly. However, the PDP did lose one House of Representatives seat to the APC and although the state was easily won by PDP presidential nominee Atiku Abubakar, it still swung towards Buhari compared to 2015 and had lower turnout.

At the start of the 2019–2023 term, Omo-Agege was elected Deputy President of the Senate. By the middle of the term, Omo-Agege had filed 20 bills compared to Nwaoboshi's and Manager's two bills each. However, Nwaoboshi was also high-profile due to his defection to the APC in June 2021 and his continued legal cases. Three major corruption scandals struck Nwaoboshi with the federal government filing three counts of false asset declaration against him in June 2019, the Niger Delta Development Commission accusing him of using front companies to defraud the Commission out of ₦3.6 billion in June 2020, and his continued trial on ₦322 million fraud and money laundering; the fraud trial ended in July 2022 with a seven-year prison sentence for Nwaoboshi but he stated his intent to appeal and feigned illness in attempt to avoid the sentence.

Overview

Summary

Delta Central 

The Delta Central Senatorial District covers the local government areas of Ethiope East, Ethiope West, Sapele, Okpe, Udu, Ughelli North, Ughelli South, and Uvwie. The incumbent Ovie Omo-Agege (APC) was re-elected with 51.3% of the vote in 2019. In April 2022, Omo-Agege announced that he would run for governor of Delta State, instead of seeking re-election.

Primary elections

All Progressives Congress 

Prior to the primary, Omo-Agege endorsed Ede Dafinone as his anointed successor in an reported attempt to further his political network and become a godfather. The primary in Ughelli resulted in Dafinone—the Chairman of the Manufacturers Association of Nigeria Export Promotion Group—emerging as the nominee unopposed. Like other APC senatorial primary winners, Dafinone was unopposed reportedly due to an agreement between Omo-Agege, Nwaoboshi, and other state APC leaders.

People's Democratic Party 

Pre-primary analysis noted the primary as one of many proxy battles between former Governor James Ibori and Governor Ifeanyi Okowa with the former backing former Senator Ighoyota Amori and the latter supporting John Nani. The primary resulted in Amori defeating runner-up Nani by 7% at the Sapele Stadium; the result was a rare win for Ibori's camp as its candidate lost the gubernatorial primary and other Okowa loyalists won other nominations.

General election

Results

Delta North 

The Delta North Senatorial District covers the local government areas of Aniocha North, Aniocha South, Ika North East, Ika South, Ndokwa East, Ndokwa West, Oshimili South, Oshimili North, and Ukwuani. The incumbent Peter Nwaoboshi (APC) was elected with 82.2% of the vote in 2019 as a member of the PDP; he defected to the APC in June 2021. Nwaoboshi is running for re-election.

Primary elections

All Progressives Congress 

The primary at the Federal College of Education (Technical) in Asaba resulted in Nwaoboshi emerging as the nominee unopposed. Like other APC senatorial primary winners, Nwaoboshi was unopposed reportedly due to an agreement between Omo-Agege, Nwaoboshi, and other state APC leaders.

People's Democratic Party 

In the months before the primary, some pundits expected outgoing Governor Ifeanyi Okowa to run for a return to the Senate; however, he declined to run and was later selected as the PDP vice presidential nominee. Okowa chose to support Ned Nwoko for the PDP nomination. The primary at the Stephen Keshi Stadium in Asaba resulted in Nwoko—a former MHR, businessman, and husband of Regina Daniels—emerging as the nominee over businessman Paul Osaji by a 57% margin. After collation completed, Nwoko claimed that his entrance into the Senate would positively impact the entire nation.

Campaign
After the start of the official campaign period in October, Nwoko went on the offensive by deriding Nwaoboshi's tenure as senator as useless along with daring Nwaoboshi to start open campaigning. By late November, pundits and civil groups had also noted Nwaoboshi's absence from campaigning with rumors that it was connected to his avoidance of his prison term. In early January 2023, the Supreme Court briefly granted Nwaoboshi bail while fast tracking the date of his appeal hearings. However, near the end of the month, the court revoked the bail based on the fact that Nwaoboshi had remained a fugitive since his sentencing. On 6 February, Nwaoboshi was finally caught in Lagos by the EFCC and imprisoned at the Ikoyi Custodial Centre.

General election

Results

Delta South 

The Delta South Senatorial District covers the local government areas of Bomadi, Burutu, Isoko North, Isoko South, Patani, Warri North, Warri South, and Warri South West. The incumbent James Manager (PDP) was elected with 66.2% of the vote in 2019. In April 2022, Manager announced that he would run for governor of Delta State, instead of seeking re-election; he lost the PDP gubernatorial primary.

Primary elections

All Progressives Congress 

The primary in Oleh resulted in Joel-Onowakpo Thomas—the former Chairman of Delta State Board of Internal Revenue—emerging as the nominee unopposed. Like other APC senatorial primary winners, Thomas was unopposed reportedly due to an agreement between Omo-Agege, Nwaoboshi, and other state APC leaders.

People's Democratic Party 

Former Governor Emmanuel Uduaghan, who was the APC nominee for the seat in 2019 and returned to the PDP in 2020, initially announced a new run for the seat but he withdrew and retired from politics in March 2022. Both of the two remaining major candidates—former DESOPADEC Chairman Michael Diden and former MHR Daniel Reyenieju—solicited Uduaghan's endorsement before the primary. On the primary date, Diden defeated Reyenieju by a 47% margin at the Warri Township Stadium. After the vote, Diden said the victory was a demonstration of the electorate's confidence in him.

General election

Results

See also 
 2023 Nigerian Senate election
 2023 Nigerian elections

Notes

References 

Delta State senatorial elections
2023 Delta State elections
Delta State Senate elections